Daniel Voorhees may refer to:

 Daniel W. Voorhees (1827–1897), lawyer and United States Senator from Indiana
 Bust of Daniel W. Voorhees, a public artwork by American artist James Paxton Voorhees
 Daniel S. Voorhees, transient restaurant porter who confessed to the 1947 murder of Elizabeth Short
 Daniel Spader Voorhees (1852–1935), New Jersey state treasurer